The Washington State Republican Party is the state affiliate of the national United States Republican Party, headquartered in Bellevue.

History

Campaigns and elections

Washington voters tend to support Democratic Party candidates, with The New York Times referring to the state as "Democratopolis." 
The last Republican governor in Washington was John Spellman, who held office from 1981 to 1985. Republicans came closest to recapturing the state's chief executive office in 2004 when Democrat Christine Gregoire secured election by just 133 votes out of 2.8 million cast. The last time Washington gave its electoral votes to a Republican candidate for U.S. president was in 1984, when a majority in the state voted for Ronald Reagan.

Early years

The early history of the state saw firm electoral dominance by the Republican Party. In 1889, Republicans prevailed in the first election for governor and scored  majorities in both chambers of the inaugural state legislature. William Owen Bush, Washington's first African-American legislator, is credited with introducing the legislation that led to the establishment of Washington State University. Elected as a Republican from Thurston County, Bush was known as a tireless promoter of Washington agriculture.

Republican policies in the early period of statehood were advanced by the party-connected Seattle Post-Intelligencer and, later, by the Seattle Republican. Founded by ex-slave Horace Cayton, the Seattle Republican would grow to become the second-largest newspaper in Seattle before it folded in 1917. "The success of the Republican Party is one of its highest ambitions," Cayton said of his publication.

In 1922 Republican Reba Hurn of Spokane became the first woman elected to the Washington State Senate, serving from 1923 to 1930. Hurn advocated for conservative fiscal policies and was a supporter of prohibition, but otherwise espoused a generally liberal social agenda, helping to pass the state's first child labor laws.

Charles Stokes became the first African-American elected to the state legislature from King County in 1950. He led the Republican Party delegation to the 1952 Republican National Convention where he spoke in support of Dwight Eisenhower's presidential nomination and later introduced the legislation that created Washington's Lottery.

Resurgence
After a period of declining fortunes, in 1964 Republican Dan Evans was elected governor at the age of 39, becoming the youngest person to hold the state's chief executive office. The architect of Evans' victory, C. Montgomery Johnson., became the party's first full-time chairman. Johnson, a former forest ranger, publicist for Weyerhauser, early pro-choice advocate and champion of limited government, led a purge of John Birch Society members from the Washington Republican party, declaring afterward that "we had to make the term 'conservative' respectable again. The only way to do it was to get the far right off the backs of conservatives. The Republican Party is not the far-right."

In 1971 Johnson quit the party chairmanship to form a political consulting firm. With the warning that future tolerance of the John Birch Society would be "the instrument of Republican defeat - statewide, regionally, and locally," party leaders elected Johnson's political ally, Earl Davenport, to replace him as party head. The election, the same year, of Republican Michael Ross from Seattle's 37th legislative district foreshadowed eventual changes in Washington state law. The former treasurer of the Seattle chapter of the Congress of Racial Equality, Ross grabbed headlines when he introduced a bill to legalize marijuana. (While the measure failed, Washington would eventually become the first state to legalize the manufacture and sale of marijuana in 2012.) During a period of racial tensions at Rainier Beach High School, Ross commandeered a state vehicle and drove a contingent of armed Black Panthers to the school to protect African-American students. In 1973 Ross attempted an unsuccessful bid for Seattle City Council. One of his campaign volunteers in that contest was the Republican party's 2004 and 2008 gubernatorial nominee Dino Rossi.

Modern era
The Republican Revolution of 1994 helped party candidates score an unprecedented seven of the state's nine seats in the U.S. House of Representatives. In Washington's 5th congressional district Republican George Nethercutt unseated Tom Foley, the incumbent Speaker of the United States House of Representatives. Foley's defeat marked the first time a sitting Speaker had been defeated in a reelection in 132 years. Another Republican elevated to national office as a result of the 1994 elections was Jack Metcalf. Described by The Seattle Times as "the vestige of a certain place the Northwest used to be," Metcalf typified the unconventional characteristics for which Washington Republicans had previously been known. One of the few Republicans in the late 1990s endorsed by organized labor, Metcalf blended fiscal conservatism with environmental advocacy, working with the anti-whaling group Sea Shepherd Conservation Society and sponsoring an abortive effort to require labeling of genetically modified foods.

The Washington state Republican party has, in recent years, struggled with internal divisions between its historic core of social liberals and a strengthening contingent of religious conservatives. The party's 1996 gubernatorial candidate, paleoconservative Ellen Craswell, won the Republican nomination by only a slim margin before being soundly defeated in the general election by Democrat Gary Locke. Craswell would ultimately quit the party to help form the American Heritage Party. Concerns about increasing social conservatism in the party led state legislators Fred Jarrett and Rodney Tom to drop their Republican affiliation in the late 2000s and join the Democratic Party.  
Eastern Washington is considered a stronghold of the party. Republican candidates have also performed well in the eastern half of King County and in Seattle's affluent Madison Park neighborhood in the past.

Among the largest recent financial backers of the party's activities are the National Electrical Contractors Association, Kemper Holdings, Microsoft, real estate developer Clyde Holland, and investor Richard Alvord (Alvord's parents, meanwhile, are Democratic Party benefactors).

Trump era to present 
Since 2016, the state GOP and its voter base have undergone a hard rightward shift in their political views and positions along with the embrace of Trumpism. This includes the party being completely taken over by social conservatives including gun rights and anti-abortion activists. This has led to many people on the Eastside and elsewhere in the state abandoning the party.

After the 2020 Washington gubernatorial election, despite Jay Inslee's large margin of victory, Republican candidate Loren Culp refused to concede his loss and gave no concession speech, while making unsubstantiated claims of voting fraud.

After Joe Biden defeated Donald Trump in the 2020 presidential election, state Republicans were divided over Trump's false claims of election fraud, with some rejecting or embracing the claims. In the aftermath, some Republicans and county chapters have spread misinformation and conspiracy theories over the 2020 election. There has been efforts by a few Republican legislators to abolish the mail by voting system that's been used in the state for years, often falsely claiming there was widespread election fraud. It was also reported that a Republican lawmaker proclaimed on social media to "prepare for war" and advocated for others to join following the 2020 election.

Factions and affiliated groups

The Washington chapter of the National Federation of Republican Women was established in 1945 and currently consists of more than 30 local Republican women's clubs.

The Washington College Republican Federation has College Republicans chapters at 10 of the state's colleges and universities. Past members of the University of Washington chapter of the group have included former gubernatorial candidate John Carlson, and former state party chairmen Kirby Wilbur and Luke Esser.

An independent pressure group founded in 1990, Mainstream Republicans of Washington, advances efforts to moderate Republican policies and recruit centrist candidates. The group's members include former state legislators Gary Alexander, Steve Litzow, and Hans Zeiger.

In 2005 an organization of Republican attorneys and former elected officials, the Constitutional Law PAC, was formed to advocate in state judicial elections. The current head of that organization is former U.S. Senator Slade Gorton.

A Washington chapter of the Republican Liberty Caucus was organized in 2012 to push a libertarian agenda. Former state legislators Matt Shea and Jason Overstreet have been involved with the group.

Though officially non-partisan, the Olympia-based think tank Evergreen Freedom Foundation has been connected with Republican candidates and causes. When former state Auditor Brian Sonntag, a Democrat, joined the foundation as an adviser in 2013, Washington State Democratic Party chair Dwight Pelz declared Sonntag was no longer a Democrat and called on him to "pay your dues to the Republican party."

Washington state has a chapter of the Log Cabin Republicans and the former executive-director of the national group, Patrick Sammon, is a native of Seattle.

Party chairmen

Current elected officials
The Washington State Republican Party controls none of the nine constitutional offices and holds a minority two of the state's 10 seats in the U.S. House of Representatives. Republicans are the minority in the Washington Senate and Washington House of Representatives.

Member of Congress

U.S. Senate 
 None

U.S. House of Representatives

Statewide offices 
 None

Legislature 
 Senate Minority Leader: John Braun
 House Minority Leader: J. T. Wilcox

Mayors 
 Spokane: Nadine Woodward

Election results

Presidential

Senatorial

Gubernatorial

See also

 Mainstream Republicans of Washington
 Washington State Democratic Party

References

External links
Washington State Republican Party

Republican Party (United States) by state
Republican Party